Sarah Lawrence is a Liberal Arts college in Westchester County, New York.

Sarah Lawrence may also refer to:
 Sarah Lawrence (Latter Day Saint) (1826–1872), wife of Joseph Smith
 Sarah Lawrence (actress) (born 1986), Australian actress and TV personality
 Sarah Lawrence, British actress best known for playing Darlene Taylor in soap opera Hollyoaks

See also
 Sara Lawrence (disambiguation)
 Sara Lawrence-Lightfoot (born 1944), American sociologist